Dyslexicon is the second and final album by the Philadelphia grunge band Dandelion, released in 1995. 

The band promoted the album by touring with Quicksand; they also played the 1995 Lollapalooza festival. Its first single, "Weird-Out", reached No. 14 on the Billboard Modern Rock Tracks chart.

Critical reception

The Philadelphia Inquirer determined that "the band rages through every cliche in the modern- rock lexicon yet manages to make each one as invigorating as a cold shower in a heat wave." Trouser Press wrote: "Despite the extra instrumentation ... Dyslexicon is bland, and an anticlimactic false ending provides a poetic inkling of the sputtering fade-out soon in store for this over-hyped band." 

The Hartford Courant stated: "Cut through the trippy fuzz that gives this album such a homogeneous throwback acid-rock feel, and you're into some seriously hard-core rock 'n' roll." The Record concluded that "there is an intriguingly ever-present babble of raw noise just beneath the surface of Dyslexicon, but the vague cliches of the song titles—'Super Cool', 'Weird-Out', 'Whatever'—bespeak a group directionless and muddled."

Track listing 
All tracks by Dandelion

"Pass the Stone" – 2:45
"Weird-Out" – 3:41
"Trailer Park Girl" – 3:16
"What a Drag" – 3:03
"Super Cool" – 4:31
"Retard" – 2:30
"False Alarm" – 2:00
"Tapped" – 5:17
"Whatever" – 1:47
"Snow Job" – 4:16
"Viva Kneval" – 3:44
"Melon from Heaven" – 4:51

Two promotional singles from the album were released, "Weird-Out" and "Trailer Park Girl." Both of these singles feature at least one or two remixes.

References

1995 albums
Ruffhouse Records albums